Hans Kristian Skibby (born 18 January 1969 in Brædstrup) is a Danish politician, who is a member of the Folketing for the Danish People's Party. He was elected into parliament at the 2005 Danish general election.

Political career
Skibby was in the municipal council of Tørring-Uldum Municipality from 1998 to 2006. He has been in the municipal council of Hedensted Municipality since 2006.

Skibby first ran for parliament in the 2001 election in the Vejle Constituency. He wasn't elected into parliament, though he became a substitute member for the constituency. He acted as a substitute member of the Folketing from 16 April 2002 to 31 May 2002. He ran again in the 2005 election and was elected into parliament. When the constituencies were changed in 2007, Skibby ran in the new Østjylland Constituency in the 2007 election. He was reelected in this election, and again in 2011 with 2,947 votes. He was reelected again in 2015 with 4,992	votes and in 2019 with 2,834	votes.

References

External links 
 Biography on the website of the Danish Parliament (Folketinget)

Living people
1969 births
People from Horsens Municipality
Danish municipal councillors
Danish People's Party politicians
Members of the Folketing 2005–2007
Members of the Folketing 2007–2011
Members of the Folketing 2011–2015
Members of the Folketing 2015–2019
Members of the Folketing 2019–2022
Denmark Democrats politicians